Ganapathi Krishnan (born 24 June 1989) is an Indian racewalker from Kone Goundanur, a village in Krishnagiri district of Tamil Nadu state, India.

He was selected to represent India at the 2016 Summer Olympics in Rio de Janeiro, in the men's 20 kilometres walk.

References

External links

1989 births
Living people
Indian male racewalkers
Olympic athletes of India
Athletes (track and field) at the 2016 Summer Olympics
People from Krishnagiri district
Athletes from Tamil Nadu
Athletes (track and field) at the 2014 Asian Games
Asian Games competitors for India